AG0302-COVID‑19  is a COVID-19 vaccine candidate developed by AnGes Inc.This candidate followed a previous one called AG0301-COVID‑19.

References 

Clinical trials
Japanese COVID-19 vaccines
DNA vaccines